Events in the year 1152 in Norway.

Incumbents
 Monarchs – Sigurd II Haraldsson, Eystein II Haraldsson, Inge I Haraldsson

Events
Trondheim is given the status of archdiocese.
Trondheim Cathedral School is established.

Arts and literature

Births

Deaths

References

Norway